Galebre-Galébouo is a town in south-central Ivory Coast. It is a sub-prefecture of Gagnoa Department in Gôh Region, Gôh-Djiboua District.

Galebre-Galébouo was a commune until March 2012, when it became one of 1126 communes nationwide that were abolished.

In 2021, the population of the sub-prefecture of Galebre-Galébouo was 38,550.

Villages
The 5 villages of the sub-prefecture of Galebre-Galébouo and their population in 2014 are:
 Galébré/Galebouo  (16 389)
 Gbogouahio  (2 805)
 Gnigbawa  (1 636)
 Kosséhoa  (3 150)
 Onahio  (9 289)

References

Sub-prefectures of Gôh
Former communes of Ivory Coast